Andrea Raaholt (born 17 April 1996 in Ålesund) is a Norwegian tennis player.

Raaholt has a WTA singles career high ranking of 845 achieved on 26 September 2016. She also has a WTA doubles career high ranking of 1130 also achieved on 26 September 2016.

Her mother and coach Amy Jönsson Raaholt also played on the pro tour.

She is a member of the Norway Fed Cup team and has a win–loss record in the Fed Cup of 3-1.

ITF finals (0–1)

Doubles (0–1)

Fed Cup participation

Doubles

References

External links
 
 
 

1996 births
Living people
Sportspeople from Ålesund
Norwegian female tennis players
21st-century Norwegian women